Clairville is a community in Weldford Parish, New Brunswick, located 5.34 km NE of Coal Branch, on the road to Jailletville on Route 465. It was once called Hawk Ridge or New Lorne Settlement and some claim it was renamed Clairville for an early settler, Clairville Price who was a Post Master there 1905-1958, however, others believe it may have been named for the McLeary family who originally came from Scotland and settled in that location.

History

Notable people

See also
List of communities in New Brunswick

References

Bordering communities

Settlements in New Brunswick
Communities in Kent County, New Brunswick